Jørgen Klubien (born May 20, 1958) is a Danish animator, storyboard artist, and writer. He is known for working on many Disney films, like The Nightmare Before Christmas (1993), The Lion King (1994), A Bug's Life (1998), Cars (2006) and Frankenweenie (2012).

Career
Klubien is best known for working on many animated films, such as Oliver & Company (1988), The Little Mermaid (1989), The Rescuers Down Under (1990), Pocahontas (1995), James and the Giant Peach (1996), Mulan (1998), Toy Story 2 (1999), Monsters, Inc. (2001), Shrek Forever After (2010), Free Birds (2013), The Emoji Movie (2017), Wonder Park (2019), and Dumbo (2019).

Filmography

Film
 Peter-No-Tail (1981) - (animator)
 Otto Is a Rhino (1983) - (animator)
 Pee-wee's Big Adventure (1985) - (cel animator)
 An American Tail (1986) - (additional animator)
 The Brave Little Toaster (1987) - (character animator)
 Oliver & Company (1988) - (character animator)
 The Little Mermaid (1989) - (character animator)
 The Rescuers Down Under (1990) - (character animator: Wilbur)
 The Very Hungry Caterpillar and Other Stories (1993) - (animator)
 The Nightmare Before Christmas (1993) - (storyboard artist)
 The History of the Wonderful World (1993) - (animator)
 The Lion King (1994) -  (story)
 Pocahontas (1995) - (additional story development)
 The Baby-Sitters Club (1995) - (cel animator)
 James and the Giant Peach (1996) - (storyboard artist)
 Mulan (1998) - (additional story material)
 A Bug's Life (1998) - (storyboard artist)
 Toy Story 2 (1999) - (additional storyboard artist)
 Monsters, Inc. (2001) - (additional storyboarding)
 Curious George (2006) - (storyboard artist)
 Cars (2006) - (original story by) / (screenplay by) / additional storyboarding)
 Shrek Forever After (2010) - (additional story artist)
 Frankenweenie (2012) - (storyboard artist) / (art department illustrator: Los Angeles)
 Free Birds (2013) - (additional storyboard artist)
 The Emoji Movie (2017) - (storyboard artist)
 Wonder Park (2019) - (story artist)
 Dumbo (2019) - (development story beat boards & character design)

External links
 
The Amazing Double Life of Jorgen Klubien at FLIP Animation blog
 
 

1958 births
Living people
Danish male writers
Danish animators
Danish male screenwriters
Danish storyboard artists
People from Copenhagen
Walt Disney Animation Studios people
Pixar people
DreamWorks Animation people